The 2021 Cook Out 250 was a NASCAR Xfinity Series race held on April 9, 2021. It was contested over 250 laps on the  oval. It was the seventh race of the 2021 NASCAR Xfinity Series season. JR Motorsports driver Josh Berry, running part-time, collected his career Xfinity series win.

Report

Background
Martinsville Speedway is an NASCAR-owned stock car racing track located in Henry County, in Ridgeway, Virginia, just to the south of Martinsville. At  in length, it is the shortest track in the NASCAR Xfinity Series. The track was also one of the first paved oval tracks in NASCAR, being built in 1947 by H. Clay Earles. It is also the only remaining race track that has been on the NASCAR circuit from its beginning in 1948.

Entry list 

 (R) denotes rookie driver.
 (i) denotes driver who is ineligible for series driver points.

Qualifying
Harrison Burton was awarded the pole for the race as determined by competition-based formula. Jordan Anderson, Ronnie Bassett Jr., and Andy Lally did not have enough points to qualify for the race.

Starting Lineups

Race

Race results

Stage Results 
Stage One
Laps: 60

Stage Two
Laps: 60

Final Stage Results 

Laps: 130

Race statistics 

 Lead changes: 13 among 9 different drivers
 Cautions/Laps: 12 for 75
 Time of race: 2 hours, 12 minutes, and 2 seconds
 Average speed:

References 

NASCAR races at Martinsville Speedway
2021 in sports in Virginia
Cook Out 250
2021 NASCAR Xfinity Series